Schnuerera ultunensis is a bacterium from the family Tissierellaceae.

References

Bacteria described in 1996
Bacillota